Michèle Wolf is a French former football player who played as a forward for French club  Reims of the Division 1 Féminine.

References

1954 births
People from Strasbourg
French women's footballers
Division 1 Féminine players
Stade de Reims Féminines players
Olympique Lyonnais Féminin players
Women's association football midfielders
France women's international footballers
Living people